Turris is a genus of sea snails, marine gastropod mollusks in the family Turridae, the turrids.

Description
The generally large shells are variegated with spots. The fusiform shell is turriculated with a long, sharp spire. The aperture is ovate. The columellar lip is smooth. The outer lip is separated with a narrow profound sinus from the suture rather than distantly. The siphonal canal is long and narrow, straight and open.

(Description by Charles Hedley) The shell is large, with a tall slender spire. The outer lip is sharp, without fold or thickening. The siphonal notch is a deep slit with parallel sides following a walled-in fasciole. Within the body whorl are sharp raised revolving threads, a feature shared by related genera. The protoconch consists of two smooth rounded whorls. The operculum is unguiculate, with an apical nucleus.

The foot of the animal is anteriorly truncated  but obtuse posteriorly. The tentacles are cylindrical, with the eyes externally near their base The teeth of the toxoglossan radula are falciform and angulated (formula 1-0-1).

Distribution
This genus inhabits warm seas.

Species
The extinct species are only tentatively placed in the genus Turris.

 †  Turris adendanii Abbass, 1967 
 † Turris aenigmaticus Dartevelle (E.) & Brébion (P.), 1956 
 † Turris aequensis (J.P.S. Grateloup, 1832 ) 
 † Turris ahmedi Abbass, 1967  
 †  Turris altispira (W.L. May, 1922 ) 
 Turris ambages 
 Turris amicta  
 † Turris andersoni Dickerson 1913
 Turris annulata 
 Turris babylonia (
 †Turris baudoni (G.P. Deshayes, 1866)
 Turris bipartita 
 Turris brevicanalis 
 † Turris burroensis Nelson 1925
 † Turris canaliculata É.A. Benoist, 1873 
 † Turris carlsoni Anderson and Martin 1914
 Turris chaldaea 
 † Turris clallamensis Weaver 1916
 Turris clausifossata 
 † Turris cleopatrae Abbass 1967 
 Turris condei 
 Turris crispa 
 † Turris dickersoni C.E. Weaver, 1916
 † Turris elsmerensis English 1914
 Turris faleiroi 
 †Turris farouqui  
 † Turris fernandoensis English 1914
 Turris garnonsii 
 † Turris garoensis Mukerjee 1939 
 † Turris gilchristi Dey 1961 
 Turris grandis 
 Turris guidopoppei 
 Turris hidalgoi 
 † Turris higoensis Nagao 1928
 † Turris hornesi Deshayes 1866 
 † Turris inconstans Cooper 1894
 Turris intercancellata 
 Turris intricata 
 † Turris kaffraria Woods 1906
 Turris kantori 
 Turris kathiewayae 
 † Turris kirkensis Clark 1915
 † Turris lincolnensis Anderson and Martin 1914
 † Turris louderbacki Dickerson 1914
 † Turris monilifera (Cooper 1894)
 † Turris multigyrata Cossmann 1906
 Turris normandavidsoni 
 † Turris packardi Weaver, 1916
 Turris pagasa 
 † Turris perarata (TateE in Cossmann, 1896)
 † Turris perkinsiana Cooper 1894
 † Turris plicata Waring 1917
 Turris proesignis (E.A. Smith, 1895)
 † Turris pulchra Dickerson 1915
 Turris ruthae 
 † Turris selwyni (Pritchard, 1904) 
 † Turris semipustulosa Lozouet, 2017 
 †  Turris septemlirata (G.F. Harris, 1897 ) 
 Turris spectabilis 
 † Turris suturalis Cooper 1894
 † Turris thurstonensis 
 † Turris trilirata (G.F. Harris, 1897)
 Turris venusta 
 Turris yeddoensis 
 † Turris vermicularis (Grateloup, 1832) 
 † Turris worcesteri Winkle 1918
 † Turris wynoocheensis Weaver, 1916

<div align=center>

Fossil Turris-species 

</div align=center>

Synonyms
 Turris abbreviata (Reeve, 1843): synonym of Lophiotoma abbreviata (Reeve, 1843)
 Turris abyssorum (Locard, 1897): synonym of Gymnobela abyssorum (Locard, 1897)
 Turris acuta (Perry, 1811): synonym of Lophiotoma acuta (Perry, 1811)
 Turris aelomitra Tinker, 1952: synonym of Gemmula monilifera (Pease, 1860) (unavailable name, a name found in collections only)
 Turris ankaramanyensis Bozzetti, 2006: synonym of Turris tanyspira Kilburn, 1975
 Turris annae (Hoernes & Auinger, 1891): synonym of Unedogemmula annae (Hoernes & Auinger, 1891)
 Turris antiope (W.H. Dall, 1918): synonym of Mangelia recta E.A. Smith, 1888; synonym of  Pleurotoma antiope W.H. Dall, 1918
 Turris armilda Dall, 1908: synonym of Fusiturricula armilda (Dall, 1908)
 Turris assyria Olivera, Seronay & Fedosov, 2010: synonym of Turris babylonia (Linnaeus, 1758)
 Turris bairdii W.H. Dall, 1889: synonym of Volutomitra bairdii (W.H. Dall, 1889) 
  † Turris bimarginatus Suter, 1917: synonym of † Gemmula bimarginata (Suter, 1917) (original combination)
 Turris beblammena (Sturany, 1903): synonym of Taranidaphne beblammena (Sturany, 1903)
 Turris binda Garrard, 1961: synonym of Unedogemmula unedo (Kiener, 1839)
 † Turris brassoensis Mansfield 1925: synonym of † Gemmula machapoorensis Maury 1925
 Turris cincta: synonym of Turridrupa cincta (Lamarck, 1822)
 Turris cingulifera: synonym of Iotyrris cingulifera (Lamarck, 1822)
 Turris clionellaeformis (Weinkauff & Kobelt, 1875): synonym of Drillia clionellaeformis (Weinkauff & Kobelt, 1875)
 Turris cosmoi Sykes, 1930: synonym of Gemmula cosmoi (Sykes, 1930)
 Turris cristata : synonym of Purpuraturris cristata (Vera-Peláez, Vega-Luz & Lozano-Francisco, 2000)
 Turris cryptorrhaphe : synonym of Purpuraturris cryptorraphe (G. B. Sowerby I, 1825) (superseded combination)
 † Turris denticula (Basterot, 1825): synonym of † Gemmula denticula (Basterot, 1825) 
 Turris diaulax Dall, 1908: synonym of Rhodopetoma diaulax (Dall, 1908)
 Turris dolenta W.H. Dall, 1908synonym of Fusiturricula dolenta (W.H. Dall, 1908)
 Turris dollyae Olivera, 1999: synonym of Turris crispa (Lamarck, 1816)
 Turris diaulax Dall, 1908: synonym of Antiplanes diaulax (Dall, 1908)
 Turris dollyae B. M. Olivera, 1999: synonym of Turris crispa (Lamarck, 1816)
 Turris euryclea W.H. Dall, 1919: synonym of Agathotoma alcippe (W.H. Dall, 1918)
 Turris formosissima Smith E. A., 1915: synonym of Polystira formosissima (Smith E. A., 1915)
 Turris fusinella Dall, 1908: synonym of Fusiturricula fusinella (Dall, 1908)
 Turris gilchristi (G. B. Sowerby III, 1902): synonym of Gemmula gilchristi (G. B. Sowerby III, 1902)
 Turris halcyonis Dall, 1908: synonym of Ophiodermella inermis (Reeve, 1843)
 Turris husamaru Nomura, 1940: synonym of Gemmula husamaru (Nomura, 1940)
  Turris hyugaensis T. Shuto, 1961 : synonym of Kuroshioturris hyugaensis (Shuto, 1961)
 Turris imperfecti Röding, 1798: synonym of Turris babylonia (Röding, 1798)
 Turris indica Röding, 1798: synonym of Unedogemmula indica (Deshayes, 1833)
 Turris integra (Thiele, 1925): synonym of Crassispira integra Thiele, 1925
 Turris invicta Melvill, J.C. 1910: synonym of Unedogemmula unedo (Kiener, 1839)
 Turris joubini (Dautzenberg & Fischer, 1906): synonym of Corinnaeturris leucomata (Dall, 1881)
 Turris kilburni Vera-Pelaez et al., 2000: synonym of Turris pagasa Olivera, 2000
 Turris lignaria (G. B. Sowerby III, 1903): synonym of Drillia lignaria (G. B. Sowerby III, 1903)
 Turris lirata (W.H. Pease, 1869): synonym of Iotyrris cerithiformis (A.W.B. Powell, 1964)
 Turris lobata (G. B. Sowerby III, 1903): synonym of Ptychosyrinx lobata (G. B. Sowerby III, 1903): synonym of Cryptogemma praesignis (E. A. Smith, 1895)
 Turris locardi A.R.J.B. Bavay, 1906: synonym of Aphanitoma locardi (A.R.J.B. Bavay, 1906)
 Turris macella Melvill, 1923: synonym of Agladrillia macella (Melvill, 1923)
 Turris marmorata (J.B.P.A. Lamarck, 1816 ): synonym of Lophiotoma acuta (Perry, 1811)
 Turris monilifera Pease, 1860: synonym of Gemmula monilifera (Pease, 1860)
 Turris munizi Vera-Pelaez et al., 2000: synonym of Gemmula lululimi Olivera, 2000
 Turris nadaensis M. Azuma, 1973: synonym of Purpuraturris nadensis (M. Azuma, 1973)
 Turris nexilis Hutton, 1885: synonym of Taranis nexilis (Hutton, 1885)
 Turris nobilis Röding, 1798: synonym of Turris babylonia (Linnaeus, 1758)
 Turris nodifera (Lamarck, 1822): synonym of Turricula javana (Linnaeus, 1767) (combination of M.Smith, 1940)
 Turris notilla W.H. Dall, 1908: synonym of Fusiturricula notilla (W.H. Dall, 1908) -
 Turris omnipurpurata : synonym of Purpuraturris omnipurpurata (Vera-Peláez, Vega-Luz & Lozano-Francisco, 2000)
 Turris orthopleura Kilburn, 1983: synonym of Makiyamaia orthopleura (Kilburn, 1983)
 Turris operosa Röding, 1798: synonym of Doxander operosus (Röding, 1798) (original combination)
 † Turris panarica A.A. Olsson, 1942 : synonym of † Buridrillia panarica (A.A. Olsson, 1942)
 † Turris paracantha J.E. Tenison-Woods, 1877: synonym of † Bathytoma paracantha (J.E. Tenison-Woods, 1877) 
 Turris pluteata Reeve: synonym of Fusiturris pluteata (Reeve, 1843)
 Turris pseudogranosa Nomura, 1940: synonym of Gemmula pseudogranosa (Nomura, 1940)
 Turris pulchra Röding, 1798: synonym of Turris babylonia (Linnaeus, 1758)
 Turris queenslandis A.W.B. Powell, 1969: synonym of Zemacies queenslandica (A.W.B. Powell, 1969)
 Turris raffrayi C.M. Tapparone-Canefri, 1878: synonym of Turris babylonia (C. Linnaeus, 1758)
 Turris regia Röding, 1798: synonym of Clavatula regia (Röding, 1798)
 † Turris regularis Koninck, 1837; synonym of † Orthosurcula regularis (Koninck, 1837)
 Turris resina Dall, 1908: synonym of Hindsiclava resina (Dall, 1908)
 Turris rugitecta Dall, 1918: synonym of Crassispira rugitecta (Dall, 1918)
 Turris ruthveniana Melvill, 1923: synonym of Lophiotoma ruthveniana (Melvill, 1923)
 Turris saldanhae Barnard, 1958: synonym of Comitas saldanhae (Barnard, 1958)
 Turris solomonensis (Smith E. A., 1876): synonym of Inquisitor solomonensis (E. A. Smith, 1876)
 Turris stolida (Hinds, 1843): synonym of Comitas stolida (Hinds, 1843)
 † Turris subconcava (G.F. Harris, 1897) : synonym of † Xenuroturris subconcavus (G.F. Harris, 1897)  
 Turris tanyspira : synonym of Purpuraturris tanyspira (Kilburn, 1975)
 Turris taxea Röding, 1798: synonym of Clavatula taxea (Röding, 1798)
 Turris tigrina Lamarck: synonym of Lophiotoma indica (Röding, 1798)
 Turris tornatum Röding, 1798: synonym of Turris babylonia (Linnaeus, 1758)
 Turris torta Dautzenberg: synonym of Fusiturris torta (Dautzenberg, 1912)
 Turris totiphyllis Oliverio, 1999: synonym of Turris hidalgoi Vera-Pelaez, Vega-Luz & Lozano-Francisco, 2000
 Turris undatiruga Bivona: synonym of Fusiturris undatiruga (Bivona Ant. in Bivona And., 1838)
 Turris undosa : synonym of Purpuraturris undosa (Lamarck, 1816) (superseded combination)
 Turris unedo (Kiener, 1839): synonym of Unedogemmula unedo (Kiener, 1839)
 Turris violacea: synonym of Tomopleura reevii (C. B. Adams, 1850)
 Turris woodii L.C. Kiener, 1840: synonym of Purpuraturris cryptorraphe (G.B. Sowerby I, 1825)

References

 Kilburn R.N., Fedosov A.E. & Olivera B.M. (2012) Revision of the genus Turris Batsch, 1789 (Gastropoda: Conoidea: Turridae) with the description of six new species. Zootaxa 3244: 1-58.
 Dubois A. & Bour R. (2010). The distinction between family-series and class-series nomina in zoological nomenclature, with emphasis on the nomina created by Batsch (1788, 1789) and on the higher nomenclature of turtles. Bonn Zoological Bulletin. 57(2): 149-171.

External links
 Batsch A.J.G.C. (1789). Versuch einer Anleitung, zur Kenntniß und Geschichte der Thiere und Mineralien, für akademische Vorlesungen entworfen, und mit den nöthigsten Abbildungen versehen. Vol. 2. Besondre Geschichte der Insekten, Gewürme und Mineralien. Jena: Akademische Buchhandlung
 Powell, A. W. B. (1966). The molluscan families Speightiidae and Turridae. An evaluation of the valid taxa both Recent and fossil, with lists of characteristic species. Bulletin of the Auckland Institute and Museum. 5: 1-184
 Fedosov, Alexander, et al. "Phylogeny of the genus Turris: Correlating molecular data with radular anatomy and shell morphology." Molecular phylogenetics and evolution 59.2 (2011): 263-270
  Kilburn, Richard N., Alexander E. Fedosov, and Baldomero M. Olivera. "Revision of the genus Turris (Gastropoda: Conoidea: Turridae) with the description of six new species." Zootaxa 3244.1 (2012): 1
  Bouchet, P.; Kantor, Y. I.; Sysoev, A.; Puillandre, N. (2011). A new operational classification of the Conoidea (Gastropoda). Journal of Molluscan Studies. 77(3): 273-308.
  Tucker, J.K. 2004 Catalog of recent and fossil turrids (Mollusca: Gastropoda). Zootaxa 682:1-1295.

Turridae